Abdou Karim Camara (born 27 October 1992) is a Senegalese former professional footballer who played as a midfielder for Norwegian club Molde and French clubs AS Cherbourg and Stade Montois.

Career
Camara was born in Tambacounda, and played four years at the Diambars-academy. Together with Mamadou Gando Ba, Camara signed for Molde in August 2011. He made his debut in Tippeligaen against Sogndal in the decisive match of the 2011 season.

Camara joined Cherbourg in August 2013.

Career statistics

References

1992 births
Living people
People from Tambacounda Region
Association football midfielders
Senegalese footballers
Eliteserien players
Championnat National 2 players
Diambars FC players
Molde FK players
AS Cherbourg Football players
Stade Montois (football) players
Senegalese expatriate footballers
Expatriate footballers in Norway
Expatriate footballers in France
Senegalese expatriate sportspeople in Norway
Senegalese expatriate sportspeople in France